Michael R. Norris is an American actor. He is the eldest son of the actor and martial arts champion Chuck Norris and his first wife, Dianne Holechek. He starred in the 1986 drama film Born American and the 1991 action film Delta Force 3: The Killing Game. He also directed and starred in the 2009 Christian film Birdie & Bogey.

Early life
Norris was born on October 4, 1962, in Redondo Beach, California, the son of Dianne (née Holecheck) and Walker, Texas Ranger star Chuck Norris.

Career 
Norris and his wife own 2nd Fiddle Entertainment, a movie studio. Through 2nd Fiddle Entertainment Norris has written produced and directed the films Birdie & Bogey, Maggie's Passage and I Am Gabriel.

Personal life
Norris and his brother Eric are the two sons of the union of actor Chuck Norris and Dianne Holecheck. Through his father, Norris is the nephew of Aaron Norris, the godson of Gena Norris, has a half brother and two half sisters.

On May 23, 1992, Norris married his wife Valerie. They have three children: Hannah (born 1995), and twins Max and Greta (born in 2000).

Filmography

References

External links

1962 births
Living people
20th-century American male actors
21st-century American male actors
American male karateka
American male film actors
American male television actors
Actors from Redondo Beach, California